Mário Quintana is a neighbourhood (bairro) in the city of Porto Alegre, the state capital of Rio Grande do Sul, in Brazil. Created by Law 8258 from December 22, 1998, it was named in honour of poet Mário Quintana, who had died four years before.

The occupation of Mario Quintana dates from 1896, but there were few dwellers until the 1960s, when the City Hall started to transfer masses of poor people from shantytowns in Porto Alegre to this neighbourhood. In the 1980s, authorities begun to finance some infrastructure and housing projects. In 1991, the Chico Mendes Park was created.

Today, the economic inequality among the population in Mario Quintana is quite conspicuous, as we can find slums next to gated communities.

Neighbourhoods in Porto Alegre
Populated places established in 1998